Goro Bakaksa is one of the woredas in the Somali Region of Ethiopia. Part of the Liban Zone, Goro Bekeksa is bounded on the south by the Ganale Dorya River which separates it from the Liben Zone, on the west by Guradamole, on the north by the Oromia Region, on the northeast by Elekere, and on the southeast by Cherti.

Demographics 
Based on the 2007 Census conducted by the Central Statistical Agency of Ethiopia (CSA), this woreda has a total population of 65,271, of whom 38,370 are men and 26,901 women. While 4,107 or 8.01% are urban inhabitants, a further 32,652 or 63.69% are pastoralists. 99.3% of the population said they were MuslimThis woreda is primarily inhabited by the (Gurre, Ashraf, Raito and Dawed of Gaadsan subclan) clans of the Somali.

these District consists of fifteen kebeles  which are of:- 01 kebele, 02 kebele, Asha'ad, Koyo (Biyo-badan), Joog-deer (Jookey), Gifis (af-goye), harafama, Hagar-weyne, Watiti (Kabhan), Hoofi, Du'o kora, War-gudud, Hagar-mokor, Tuur, and Hargedeb.

Notes 

Districts of Somali Region